Jean Boulanger may refer to:
 Jean Boulanger (painter), French painter
 Jean Boulanger (engraver), French line-engraver

See also
 Jean-Claude Boulanger, French prelate of the Catholic Church